Arriba los de abajo (Above those who are below) is a musical work by Juan María Solare.

It consists of seven pieces for Trio Basso (viola, violoncello and doublebass). (Cologne and Stuttgart, 18 May to 20 November 1998). [11'35"] It is dedicated to Heidrun Kiegel. Third prize in the composition contest of the "Viola Foundation Walter Witte" (Frankfurt) in May 2001. Premiered on 12 October 2002 during the German Viola Days at the Musikakademie in Trossigen by the Trio Basso (Othello Liesmann, Wolfgang Güttler).

Compositions by Juan María Solare